Gaspare de Murgiis (died 1524) was a Roman Catholic prelate who served as Bishop of Strongoli (1509–1534).

Biography
On 21 Nov 1509, Gaspare de Murgiis was appointed by Pope Julius II as Bishop of Strongoli.
He served as Bishop of Strongoli until his death in 1534.

References

External links and additional sources
 (for Chronology of Bishops) 
 (for Chronology of Bishops) 

1534 deaths
16th-century Italian Roman Catholic bishops
Bishops appointed by Pope Julius II